Women in art may refer to:

 Art featuring women as subjects
 Women artists
 Lists of women artists
 Women in Arts Award, a Ukrainian award
 Women in the art history field
 Women in Philippine art
 Women in dance
 Women in music
 Women in film